Tommaso Chieffi (born 20 December 1961) is an Italian professional sailor. He competed in the 1984 Summer Olympics.

He sailed on Italia II during the 1987 Louis Vuitton Cup and was the navigator on ''Il Moro Challenge at the 1992 Louis Vuitton Cup. Twenty years later, Chieffi sailed with Team Shosholoza at the 2007 Louis Vuitton Cup.

World Championship Titles

References

External links
 
 
 

1961 births
Living people
Italian male sailors (sport)
Olympic sailors of Italy
Sailors at the 1984 Summer Olympics – 470
Il Moro Challenge sailors
1987 America's Cup sailors
1992 America's Cup sailors
2007 America's Cup sailors
World champions in sailing for Italy
470 class world champions
Farr 30 class world champions
Swan 60 class world champions